"Feed the Tree" is a song by American alternative rock band Belly, released as the band's first single from their debut album, Star, in 1993. It is the band's biggest hit, reaching number one on the US Billboard Modern Rock Tracks chart and number 32 on the UK Singles Chart. According to lead singer Tanya Donelly, the song is a metaphor about commitment and respect, with the tree being a place on a large farm where a family would be buried.

Reception
The song was ranked number 24 on VH1's "40 Greatest One-Hit Wonders of the 90s". It was also a popular radio hit in Australia, coming in at number 25 on the Triple J Hottest 100 countdown for 1993.

Pitchfork said the song, "takes advantage of Donelly's talent for punching holes in the wall with a killer chorus. Tom Gorman's serpentine riff coils around the verses while bassist Fred Abong and drummer Chris Gorman keep their rhythms flippy-floppy."

Track listings
All songs were written by Tanya Donelly except where noted.

US CD and cassette single
 "Feed the Tree" (remix) – 3:42
 "Star" (full band version) – 2:59

UK 7-inch and cassette single
 "Feed the Tree"
 "Dream on Me"

UK 12-inch and CD single
 "Feed the Tree"
 "Trust in Me" 
 "Dream on Me"
 "Star"

Charts

See also
 Number one modern rock hits of 1993
 Triple J Hottest 100, 1993

References

1993 singles
1993 songs
4AD singles
Belly (band) songs
Reprise Records singles
Sire Records singles
Song recordings produced by Gil Norton